Chase the Ace is a form of lottery that has gained popularity since 2013 in parts of Canada. The game is used to raise funds for charities. It is also known as Crown the King and Jig the Joker.  It is unrelated to the card game Chase The Ace of the same name.

The jackpot accumulates from week-to-week until it is won, and the game is then over. Each week participants buy lottery tickets. The funds from ticket sales are divided into three parts. Typically the organizers keep 50%, the winner of the weekly lottery takes 20%, and the remaining 30% goes into the jackpot. The lottery winner also then draws a card from a deck of playing cards and wins the accumulated jackpot if the ace of spades is drawn. If not, the reduced deck is kept for the following week's game, and the jackpot rolls over to the next week.

History
In 2013 the community of Noel, Nova Scotia copied the idea from a fundraiser in Inuvik to raise funds to install floodlights at their ball field. They were the first organization to be given a licence for the game in Nova Scotia, and eventually gave away a jackpot of $209,752.50. In September 2015 about 300 lottery licences for Chase the Ace games had been issued in Nova Scotia during the previous twelve months. Similarly successful lotteries have taken place during 2015 in Newfoundland and Labrador and Prince Edward Island.

In summer 2015, a game in Inverness, Nova Scotia which started in 2014 had accumulated a large jackpot and was drawing large crowds to the village—approximately ten times the resident population—and requiring extra venues and car parking, as well as a temporary cellphone tower. After the event on 26 September 2015, when the jackpot had reached nearly $1.5 million and the ace was not drawn from the remaining deck of six cards, organizers declared that the following Saturday would be the final date for the lottery, with the rules changed to ensure that the jackpot would be won. If the initial lottery winner did not draw the ace, another ticket would be selected, with the winner receiving a consolation prize of $25,000 and a chance to draw a card. More draws and consolation prizes would be awarded in this manner until the ace was picked. The decision to terminate the game was made due to concerns over public safety and lack of facilities such as washrooms. The ace was finally drawn from a deck of just three cards and the winner won a jackpot of $1.7 million.

A Chase the Ace in Sydney, Nova Scotia saw significant participation, having reached a record jackpot of $2.6 million as of May 2016 and five cards remaining. On May 7, 2016, the $2.9 million jackpot was won by Kathy McPherson. The organizers, as well as McPherson (who previously lived in the city) announced intents to donate portions of their earnings to relief efforts for the Fort McMurray wildfire.

In 2021 it was reported spreading to South Dakota (the game, not the wildfires).

References

Lotteries in Canada